Johnno Cotterill (born 27 October 1987, Sutherland, New South Wales) is an Australian water polo player. At the 2012 Summer Olympics, he competed for the Australia men's national water polo team in the men's event. He is 6 ft 4 inches tall.

References

External links
 

1987 births
Living people
People from New South Wales
Australian male water polo players
Olympic water polo players of Australia
Water polo players at the 2012 Summer Olympics
Water polo players at the 2016 Summer Olympics